St. Cecilia's Girls' College (also known as St. Cecilia's Girls' Maha Vidyalayam or St. Cecilia's Convent) is a national school in Batticaloa, Sri Lanka.

It was founded in 1876 by Rev. Francis Xavier. In the year 1910, it was registered as an English school. The school was handed over to the Apostolic Carmel sisters in 1922.

The Advanced Level education was introduced to this school in 1970 and it was the arts stream. In 1979, the other streams of the Advanced Level such as Science, Maths and Commerce were initiated.

St. Cecilia's girls' College was upgraded as a National School in 2001. The bilingual education was commenced here in 2002. The computer learning centre of the school was inaugurated in 2003. The connecting class room project was commenced here in 2010.

See also
 List of schools in Eastern Province, Sri Lanka

References

National schools in Sri Lanka
Schools in Batticaloa